Kentland Sewer is a minor,  long river—brook—and drainage ditch of the Pevensey Levels in Hailsham, Wealden District of East Sussex, England. It gives rise to, and receives the waters of, several streams and ditches—most unnamed.

Course 
Kentland Sewer rises from an unnamed stream just north of Railland Ditch and east of Hurst Haven, flowing northerly. After giving rise to Kentland Fleet, the river briefly turns northwesterly before resuming its northerly course.

References 

Rivers of East Sussex
Rivers of the Pevensey Levels